Alexandru Gergely (sometimes: Ghergheli; Hungarian: Sándor Gergely) (16 September 1951 – 25 March 2018) was a Romanian professional footballer and manager of Hungarian ethnicity. He grew up at Unirea Cristuru Secuiesc, then playing at senior level for Steagul Roșu Brașov and FC Bihor Oradea. After retirement, Gergely managed in the youth centers of FC Bihor Oradea and Liberty Salonta, being well known for discovering footballers such as: Claudiu Keșerü, Sebastian Achim, Cristian Cigan or Sergiu Homei, among others.

Club career
Gergely grew up in Unirea Cristuru Secuiesc Football Academy and was trained at the Romanian national youth squads by famous coaches such as Gheorghe Ola or Cornel Drăgușin.

He made his debut at senior level for Steagul Roșu Brașov in 1970, also making its first appearance in the top-flight. After six years spent at the "yellow and blacks", in which he played in 142 matches and scored 34 goals, Gergely moved to FC Bihor Oradea, where he played until its retirement. At FC Bihor Oradea, "Gobe" (as he was nicknamed) was a member of the 1970s golden team, together with other two footballers from Brașov, Mircea Albu and Nicolae Florescu. He played in 126 matches for the "red and blues", scoring 45 goals.

Alexandru Gergely played in 268 Divizia A matches and scored 79 goals.

Manager career
After retirement, Gergely was for years one of the coaches that activated in the FC Bihor Oradea Youth Academy, where he discovered players such as Claudiu Keșerü, Sebastian Achim or Cristian Cigan, among many others. For a short period, during the 2000s, he was also a coach in the Liberty Salonta Academy, in that period promoting other future top-flight players, among them, Sergiu Homei.

"Gobe" was also the assistant manager of FC Bihor Oradea and Liberty Salonta senior squads and the manager of 4th tier side Petrom Abram.

Later years and death
In 2011, Gergely suffered the amputation of his right leg, the one with which he was making waves as a footballer. After this unfortunate medical event, he ended his career as a football manager. His beloved club, FC Bihor, made some efforts to help him financially in the following years, despite the fact that the club itself was in insolvency. Gergely died on 25 March 2018 at the age of 66.

References

External links
Alexandru Gergely at labtof.ro

1951 births
2018 deaths
People from Harghita County
Romanian footballers
Romania youth international footballers
Association football midfielders
Association football forwards
Liga I players
Liga II players
FC Brașov (1936) players
FC Bihor Oradea players
Romanian football managers
Romanian sportspeople of Hungarian descent